Park Eun-mi (born ) is a South Korean female  track cyclist. She competed in three events at the 2011 UCI Track Cycling World Championships.

References

External links
 Profile at cyclingarchives.com

1987 births
Living people
South Korean track cyclists
South Korean female cyclists
Place of birth missing (living people)
Cyclists at the 2006 Asian Games
Asian Games competitors for South Korea
20th-century South Korean women
21st-century South Korean women